The following lists events that happened in 1926 in El Salvador.

Incumbents
President: Alfonso Quiñónez Molina
Vice President: Pío Romero Bosque

Events

February
 15 February – C.D. Águila, a Salvadoran football club, was established.

References

 
El Salvador
1920s in El Salvador
Years of the 20th century in El Salvador
El Salvador